The Polanco Lift is a passenger elevator located in Valparaíso, Chile. It consists of three stations and connects Simpson Street with Polanco Hill. This lift is the only "true" elevator in the city, as all others are technically funiculars. Today it is more visited by tourists than by the local residents.

History 

Construction began in 1913 and concluded in 1915. Inaugurated in 1916, the lift was developed by engineer Federico Page with the assistance of the Easton Lift Company. It was declared a National Monument of Chile in 1976.

Location 
The lift is located on Polanco Hill. The lower entrance is on Simpson Street. The first station is accessible through a  tunnel. The lift then ascends to an intermediate station and continues its ascent to the final station at the top of the tower (approximately ), overlooking the entire city. A bridge connects the top of the tower to nearby streets.

See also 
 Funicular railways of Valparaíso
 Katarina Elevator
 Santa Justa Lift

References 

Buildings and structures in Valparaíso
Individual elevators
Buildings and structures completed in 1915